Nintendo originally offered a digital video output on early GameCube models. However, it was determined that less than one percent of users utilized the feature. The company eventually removed the option starting with model number DOL-101 of May 2004.
The console's technical specifications are as follows.

References

GameCube
PowerPC-based video game consoles
Video game hardware